The Los Angeles County Employees Retirement Association (LACERA) is an independent Los Angeles County agency that administers and manages the retirement fund for the County and outside Districts (Little Lake Cemetery District, Local Agency Formation Commission for the County of Los Angeles, Los Angeles County Office of Education, and South Coast Air Quality Management District). In 2012, it managed defined benefit pension plans for 156,563 civil servants (members), including 56,752 retirees, making it the largest county retirement system in the United States. In 2018, LACERA's net assets were worth .

History
LACERA was established on January 1, 1938, following passage of the County Employees Retirement Law of 1937 (CERL), which mandates LACERA to pay for the defined retirement benefits of Los Angeles County employees and their beneficiaries. In 1971, LACERA began administering a retiree healthcare benefits program.

Management
LACERA is governed by two Boards, each composed of 9 members:
Board of Retirement - responsible for the overall management of the retirement system)
Board of Investments - responsible for establishing LACERA's investment policy and objectives, and exercising authority and control over the investment management of the Fund.

Day-to-day management and operation of LACERA is delegated to a Chief Executive Officer, who is appointed by both Boards.

Board of Retirement 
The Board of Retirement (BOR) administers the retirement system, the retiree healthcare program, and the review and processing of disability retirement applications.

The Board of Retirement's members are appointed as follows:
Four members – appointed by the Los Angeles County Board of Supervisors
Two members – elected by general members
One member – elected by safety members
One member – elected by retired members
One member – the Los Angeles County Treasurer and Tax Collector, who serves as an ex officio members, as required by California law

The Board of Retirement meets at 9 a.m. on the first Wednesday of each month and the next Thursday of the following week.

Board of Investments
The Board of Investments (BOI) establishes LACERA's investment policy and objectives and exercises authority and control over the retirement fund's investment management.

The Board of Investments’ members are appointed as follows:
Four members – appointed by the Los Angeles County Board of Supervisors
Two members – elected by general members
One member – elected by safety members
One member – elected by retired members
One member – the Los Angeles County Treasurer and Tax Collector, who serves as an ex-officio members, as required by California law

The Board of Investments meets at 9 a.m. on the second Wednesday of each month.

Benefits

Health care benefits
LACERA provides health insurance plans for its retired members. LACERA covers 100% of healthcare premiums for Los Angeles County retirees who have at least 25 years of public service. For members with 10 years of public service, LACERA contributes 40% of health care plan premiums, with an additional contribution of 4% for each additional year worked.

Retirement plans
LACERA offers two tracks of retirement plans, for general members (civil servants) and for safety members (safety employees, including sheriff deputies and firefighters), further subdivided as follows:

Finances

As of June 30, 2012, LACERA's net assets were worth , a decrease of $1.1 billion, or 2.9%, from the prior year. The latest actuarial valuation on June 30, 2011, determined that LACERA had a funded ratio of actuarial assets to the actuarial accrued liability of 80.6%. For fiscal year (FY) 2011–12, LACERA's fiscal-year-to-date return on investments was 0.10%; the FY 2010-11 return was 20.40%.

Over the past 15 years, each LACERA pensions has been funded as follows:
75% – funded by returns on investment income
15% – funded with employer (County) contributions
10% – funded by with employee member contributions

Reciprocity 
LACERA has reciprocity with the other California public retirement systems, including:

 CalPERS (California Public Employees’ Retirement System)
 STRS (State Teachers' Retirement System)
 LA County Metropolitan Transportation Authority Retirement System
 Los Angeles City Employees’ Retirement System
 19 CERL Counties (county retirement systems established County Employees Retirement Law)
 City of Pasadena

LACERA also has reciprocity with other California public agencies and districts, cities, counties, school districts, superintendents of schools and others that are covered by CalPERS or have a reciprocal relationship with CalPERS.

Shareholder Activism 
LACERA is one of eight institutional investors represented by the Shareholder Rights Projects, which worked to present shareholder declassification proposals in S&P 500 annual meetings.

See also
Government of Los Angeles County
Los Angeles County Board of Supervisors

References

Public pension funds in the United States
Government agencies established in 1938
Government of Los Angeles County, California
Organizations based in Los Angeles